The common snipe (Gallinago gallinago) is a small, stocky wader native to the Old World.

The breeding habitats are marshes, bogs, tundra and wet meadows throughout the Palearctic. In the north, the distribution limit extends from Iceland over the north of the British Isles and northern Fennoscandia, where it occurs at around 70°N, as well as through European Russia and Siberia. Here it is mostly on the northern edge of the Taiga zone at 71°N, but reaches 74°N on the east coast of the Taymyr Peninsula. In the east it extends to Anadyr, Kamchatka, Bering Island and the Kuril Islands, The southern boundary of the distribution area in Europe runs through northern Portugal, central France, northern Italy, Bulgaria, and Ukraine, with populations in the west being only very scattered. In Asia, the distribution extends south to northern Turkestan, locally to Afghanistan and the Middle East, through the Altai and further to Manchuria and Ussuri. It is migratory, with European birds wintering in southern and western Europe and Africa (south to the Equator), and Asian migrants moving to tropical southern Asia. The North American Wilson's snipe was previously considered the same species, and is listed as such in older field guides.

Taxonomy
The common snipe was formally described by the Swedish naturalist Carl Linnaeus in 1758 in the tenth edition of his Systema Naturae under the binomial name Scolopax gallinago. The species is now placed with 17 other snipe in the genus Gallinago that was introduced by the French zoologist Mathurin Jacques Brisson in 1760. The name gallinago is New Latin for a woodcock or snipe from Latin gallina, "hen" and the suffix -ago, "resembling".

Two subspecies are recognised:
 G. g. faeroeensis (Brehm, CL, 1831) – breeds in Iceland, Faroe Islands, Orkney and Shetland Islands; non-breeding in British Isles
 G. g. gallinago (Linnaeus, 1758) – breeds in central, north Europe and Asia; non-breeding in west Europe, Africa, Indonesia and Japan

Description

They have short greenish-grey legs and a very long straight dark bill. The body is mottled brown with straw-yellow stripes on top and pale underneath. They have a dark stripe through the eye, with light stripes above and below it. The wings are pointed.

The common snipe is the most widespread of several similar snipes. It most closely resembles the Wilson's snipe (G. delicata) of North America, which was until recently considered to be a subspecies — G. g. delicata — of the common snipe. They differ in the number of tail feathers, with seven pairs in G. gallinago and eight pairs in G. delicata; the North American species also has a slightly thinner white trailing edge to the wings (the white is mostly on the tips of the secondaries). Both species breed in the Aleutian Islands. It is also very similar to the pin-tailed snipe (G. stenura) and Swinhoe's snipe (G. megala) of eastern Asia; identification of these species there is complex.

The subspecies faeroeensis is normally is more richly toned on the breast, its upperparts and the head than the gallinago.

Behaviour

The  common snipe is a well camouflaged bird, it is usually shy and conceals itself close to ground vegetation and flushes only when approached closely. When flushed, they utter a sharp note that sounds like scape, scape and fly off in a series of aerial zig-zags to confuse predators. They forage in soft mud, probing or picking up food by sight. They mainly eat insects and earthworms, also some plant material.

The male performs "winnowing" display during courtship, flying high in circles and then taking shallow dives to produce a "drumming" sound by vibrating its tail feathers. This sound has been compared by others to the bleating of a sheep or goat; hence in many languages the snipe is known by names signifying "flying goat", "heaven's ram", as in Scotland by "heather-bleater" and in Finnish the name taivaanvuohi, "sky goat".

Philip Manson-Bahr is credited with unravelling the mystery of how the snipe creates that unusual breathy sound which is unlike other birdsong. He worked out that the sound was created by placing out two tail feathers at 90 degrees to the direction of flight. When diving these feathers create this unusual sound. He demonstrated this in front of the British Ornithologists Union by inserting two snipe feathers into a cork which he then whirled around his head on a string.

Wing shape does not differ between sedentary and migratory common snipe, suggesting that social selection influences wing shape given this species aerial displays during courtship.

Breeding
Common snipe nest in a well-hidden location on the ground, laying four eggs of a dark olive colour, blotched and spotted with rich brown, which are incubated by the female for 18–21 days. The freshly hatched young are covered in dark maroon down, variegated with black, white and buff. The young are cared for by both parents, each parent looking after half the brood, with fledging in 10–20 days.

Conservation

Overall, the species is not threatened. Populations on the southern fringes of the breeding range in Europe are however declining with local extinction in some areas (notably in parts of England and Germany), mainly due to field drainage and agricultural intensification.

The Agreement on the Conservation of African-Eurasian Migratory Waterbirds (AEWA) applies to the species. It is still hunted as a gamebird in much of its range.

History
Old folk names include "mire snipe", "horse gowk", "heather bleat", and the variant spelling "snite". See snipe for other aspects of the name.

References

External links

 
 Ageing and sexing (PDF; 5.1 MB) by Javier Blasco-Zumeta & Gerd-Michael Heinze
 
 Gallinago gallinago at Integrated Taxonomic Information System (ITIS)
 Items, photos and sounds related to Gallinago gallinago at Europeana: Europe's digital library, museum and archive
 
 
 
 

Gallinago
Shorebirds
Birds of Eurasia
Birds described in 1758
Taxa named by Carl Linnaeus